Bernard Unabali  (5 May 1957 – 10 August 2019) was a Papua New Guinean Roman Catholic bishop who served as Bishop of the Roman Catholic Diocese of Bougainville.

Unabali was born in Papua New Guinea and was ordained to the priesthood in 1985. He served as titular bishop of Cuicul and as auxiliary bishop of the Roman Catholic Diocese of Bougainville, Papua New Guinea, from 2006 to 2009. He then served as bishop of the diocese from 2009 until his death on 10 August 2019 at the St. Luke's Medical Center in Quezon City, Philippines.

Notes

1957 births
2019 deaths
21st-century Roman Catholic bishops in Papua New Guinea
People from the Autonomous Region of Bougainville
Roman Catholic bishops of Bougainville
Papua New Guinean Roman Catholic bishops